Claude Garache (born 1929 or 1930) is a French artist. He has worked in painting, sculpture, illustration and engraving. His principal subject is the female nude. Much of his work uses a single colour on a monochrome background, very often blood-red on white.

Biography 
Garache was born in Paris on 20 January 1929 or in 1930. Between 1949 and 1959 he studied sculpture and drawing under the sculptor Robert Coutin. He spent time in the studios of Andre Lhote and Fernand Léger, and also visited Alberto Giacometti and worked in the sculpture studio of the École nationale supérieure des Beaux-Arts.. He travelled frequently in the 1950s, in Europe and to the Middle East and the United States. In 1955 he worked as an artistic advisor to Vincente Minnelli during the filming of Lust for Life, his biography of Vincent van Gogh. Garache later made sculptures for L'Année dernière à Marienbad (1961), directed by Alain Resnais.

Retrospectives 
 1966-1982 (oil on canvas), Musée Grobet-Labadié (Marseille), 1983
 1965-1985 (etchings), Zilkha Gallery (Wesleyan University, Middletown, Connecticut), 1985

Public collections 

 Museum of Modern Art, New York, New York City
 Hirshhorn Museum and Sculpture Garden, Washington DC
 Davison Art Center, Wesleyan University, Middletown, Connecticut
 Madison Art Center, Madison, Wisconsin
 Evehjem Museum of Art, Madison, Wisconsin
 Cincinnati Museum
 Musée d’Art Moderne de la Ville de Paris
 Musée national d'art moderne, Paris
 Fondation Maeght, Saint-Paul-de-Vence
 Fonds national d'art contemporain, Paris
 Musée Cantini, Marseille
 Bibliothèque nationale de France, Paris
 Bibliothèque littéraire Jacques-Doucet, Paris
 Musée Jenisch, Vevey, Switzerland
 Bibliothèque nationale suisse, Berne
 Museum Het Rembrandthuis, Amsterdam

References

Further reading and listening

Interviews and lectures 
 Interview with Valère Bertrand, "Les arts et les gens", France-Culture, Radio France, 20 juillet 1992
 Interview with Alin Avila, "Les arts et les gens", France-Culture, Radio France, 22 novembre 1993
 Florian Rodari, Marie Du Bouchet, Alain Madeleine-Perdrillat, Interviews with Claude Garache, Hazan, 2010.
 Yves Bonnefoy, at Wesleyan University, Wesleyan University, Middletown, CT, 31 octobre 1985
 Jacques-Louis Binet, Ecole du Louvre, 10 janvier 2002

Books and essays 
 Dictionary Bénézit, Oxford Press University, 2011
 Jean Starobinski, Claude Garache, Flammarion, 1988
 Jacques Dupin, Garache, Dessins, Paris, Conférence et Adam Biro éditeurs, 1999
 Garache face au modèle (texts of Raoul Ubac, Florian Rodari, Yves Bonnefoy, Philippe Jaccottet, Roger Munier, Emmanuel Laugier, Alain Madeleine-Perdrillat, Jacques Dupin, Anne de Staël, Nicolas Pesquès, François Trémolières, Michael Edwards, Jean Starobinski, John E. Jackson, Pierre Alain Tâche), La Dogana (Genève), 2006
 Dora Vallier, "Claude Garache", Derrière le miroir, Paris, Maeght, n 150, 1965
 Yves Bonnefoy, "In Garache's Color", Garache, février-mars 1974, Exhibition catalogue, Saint Paul de Vence, Fondation Maeght, 1974.
 Jacques Thuillier, "Notes brèves sur Claude Garache", Derrière le miroir, Paris, Maeght, n 213, mars 1975
 Jean Starobinski, Garache, Exhibition Catalogue, Maeght, 1976.
 Piero Bigongiari, "Arriva Nuvola Rossa : il pittore Claude Garache", L'Approdo Letterario, éditions della RAI, n 77-78, XXIII, juin 1977
 Alain Veinstein, "Archéologie de la mère", Derrière le miroir, Paris, Maeght, n° 237, janvier 1980.
 Jean Frémon, "Une version du réel", Garache, novembre 1983-janvier 1984, Exhibition catalogue, Marseille, Musée Grobet-Labadié, 1983
 Richard Stamelman, "The Incarnation of Red", Exhibition catalogue, Prints 1965-1985, 17 October-24 November 1985, Ezra and Cecile Zilkha Gallery, Wesleyan University.
 Marc Fumaroli, "Depuis longtemps, Vénus...", Repères. Cahiers d'art contemporain, Paris, galerie Lelong, n°50, 1988
 James McAllister, "The Image and the Furrow: Yves Bonnefoy and Claude Garache," Symposium 45 (1991), 97-108.
 Andrew Weiner, "Claude Garache", Spaightwood Newsletter, Madison, Wisconsin, 15 novembre 1991
 Georges Duby, Garache, juillet-août 1992, Exhibition catalogue, Orange, Musée d'Orange, 1992
 Michael Edwards, "Claude Garache: Painting and Repetition," an exhibition catalogue published by the Galerie Matisse, Institut Français, London, 1994.
 Peter Schofer, "Painting Rewrites Poetry: Baudelaire Through the Eyes of Claude Garache," Graven Images 2 (1995), 21-27.
 Judith G. Miller, "Bloodstone: Claude Garache and His Models," Graven Images 2 (1995), 7-10.
 Andrew D. Weiner, Claude Garache, Exhibition catalogue published on the occasion of the release of Bleue V and Bleue VI by Spaightwood Galleries, 1995

20th-century French painters
20th-century French male artists
French male painters
Possibly living people
Year of birth uncertain
Painters from Paris
1920s births